Comiso, is a  comune of the Province of Ragusa, Sicily, southern Italy. As of 2017, its population was 29,857.

History
In the past Comiso has been incorrectly identified with the ancient Greek colony of Casmene.

Under the Byzantines a new borough began to grow on Comiso's present site around the monasteries of St. Nicolò and Saint Blaise, expanding further under the later Norman and Aragonese domination of Sicily. It was later a fief of the Chiaromonte, Cabrera and Naselli families: the latter, counts of the city from 1571, boosted the economy of the city and built new district outside the ancient walls.

Comiso was devastated by the 1693 earthquake and rebuilt on the same spot as the old ruins in the Sicilian Baroque style.

The United States Air Force deployed Ground Launched Cruise Missiles (GLCM) to Comiso Air Base in June 1983. Women from Italy, Europe, and other parts of the world created a peace camp in Comiso in 1983 to protest the building of the base. They were inspired by women activists at the Greenham Common Women's Peace Camp in England.

The missiles were eventually dismantled after the Intermediate-Range Nuclear Forces Treaty (INF) was signed by the former Soviet Union and the United States on 8 December 1987.  The last 16 GLCMs left Comiso Air Base in 1991 and the American-occupied part of the base was returned to Italian control.

Geography
Comiso borders with the municipalities of Chiaramonte Gulfi, Ragusa and Vittoria.

The municipality has two hamlets (frazioni): Pedalino and Quaglio.

Main sights
Hot Springs, first constructed during the Roman era, with remnants of mosaics dating from the 2nd century.
Mother Church of Santa Maria delle Grazie, from the 15th century, greatly damaged by the earthquake of 1693. It has a nave and two aisles, with rich internal decorations dating from the 17th century. The high altar has a painting representing the Nativity of the Virgin, attributed to Carlo Maratta.
 San Filippo Neri (16th century), church with the annexed Oratory.
San Francesco dell'Immacolata, church built in the 13th century, with a quadrangular cloister was added in the 15th century. The church houses the burial chapel of the Naselli barons, with a funerary monument of Baldassarre II Naselli attributed to Antonello Gagini.
Maria Santissima Annunziata: parish church and minor basilica, dedicated to the Virgin of the Annunciation, founded in the 16th century, rebuilt from 1772 to 1773 when a baroque façade was added. The interior hasartworks dating from the 15th century onwards, as well as a marble font by Mario Rutelli (1912).
Castello Naselli, originally an octagonal Byzantine fortress renovated in the 14th century.
Peace Pagoda : on 24 May 1998, the Reverend Gyosho Morishita of the Nipponzan-Myōhōji Buddhist Order dedicated a stupa at Comiso, near the NATO base.

Economy
The main productive sectors are agriculture (wine and vegetables) and trades, including smithery, cabinet making and marble work. The Comisana breed of sheep takes its name from Comiso.

Transport
Comiso is connected to the nearby towns and cities by bus service and has a railway station, which lies on the Syracuse–Ragusa–Gela–Licata–Canicattì line. The train journey to Ragusa is 30 minutes, to Syracuse 2 hours 30 minutes, and to Licata 1 hour and 45 minutes.

It was previously a military base and it re-opened as a civil airport in 2013.

The main roads serving Comiso are the SS.115 (Sud Occidentale Sicula) and the SS.514 (di Chiaramonte).

People

Salvatore Adamo (b. 1943), singer
Gesualdo Bufalino (1920–1996), writer
Emilio Docente (b. 1983), footballer
Salvatore Fiume (1915–1997), painter
Giuseppe Mascara (b. 1979), footballer
Biagio Pace (1889–1955), archaeologist and politician
Biagio Pelligra (b. 1937), actor
Cristina Scuccia (b. 1989), singer

See also
 Monti Iblei Cup (Hill Climb)

References

The information in this article is based on a translation of its German equivalent.

External links

 Comiso official website
 Comiso at ragusa.net
Photographs and descriptions of some Sicilian Baroque churches - scroll down for Comiso

 
Municipalities of the Province of Ragusa
Colonies of Magna Graecia
Sicilian Baroque
Populated places established in the 7th century BC